WSPE-LP (93.1 FM) was a radio station licensed to Spencer, Tennessee, United States. The station was owned by Spencer Mountain Broadcasting, Inc. Its license expired August 1, 2020.

References

SPE-LP
Van Buren County, Tennessee
Radio stations established in 2005
2005 establishments in Tennessee
Defunct radio stations in the United States
Radio stations disestablished in 2020
2020 disestablishments in Tennessee
SPE-LP